Cyclonidea dondani is a species of sea snail, a marine gastropod mollusk in the family Eulimidae.

Description
The length of the shell attains 2.5 mm. The shell is extended and slim, with a conical shape that narrows to a pointed vertex. The outside of the shell is covered in fine spiral rims, which give it a slightly toothed impression. The color of the shell is white or cream-colored, sometimes with brownish spots or markings. As a member of the family Eulimidae, Cyclonidea dondani is likely a parasitic species that feeds on the tissues of other marine animals. Some eulimids are known to live on the exterior of their hosts, while others burrow into the host's tissues.

Distribution
This marine species occurs off the Philippines.

Original Description
 Poppe G.T. & Tagaro S. (2016). New marine mollusks from the central Philippines in the families Aclididae, Chilodontidae, Cuspidariidae, Nuculanidae, Nystiellidae, Seraphsidae and Vanikoridae. Visaya. 4(5): 83-103. page(s): 86

References

External links
 Worms Link

Eulimidae
Gastropods described in 2016